"Piña Colada Shot" is a song by Mexican-American cumbia group A.B. Quintanilla y Los Kumbia All Starz. It was released on January 27, 2017, as the first single from his ninth studio album Elektro Kumbia (2017). The song is a cover medley of past songs "El Africano", "La Chula", and "Vamos Pa' la Conga".

Track listing
 Digital download
 "Piña Colada Shot" – 3:39

Personnel
 Written by Miguel Bosé Dominguin, Miguel Matamoros, Wilfredo Carme Martinez Mattos, Calixto Antonio Ochoa, and Rosa María Girón Ávila
 Produced by A.B. Quintanilla and Luigi Giraldo
 Lead vocals by Alfonso Ramirez, Zuriel Ramirez, and Ramon Vargas
 Background vocals by A.B. Quintanilla

References

2017 songs
2017 singles
Kumbia All Starz songs
Song recordings produced by A. B. Quintanilla
Spanish-language songs